Soul Food Junkies is a 2012 documentary directed by Byron Hurt and produced by Lisa Durden. The film explores the history and culinary tradition of soul food, and its relevance to African American culture and identity. The film also documents black people that have modified their diet towards eating more vegetables.

See also
 List of films about food and drink

References

External links
 PBS Soul Food Junkies
 

2012 films
Documentary films about food and drink
Cuisine of the Southern United States
American documentary films
Documentary films about obesity
Documentary films about African Americans
2012 documentary films
Soul food
2010s American films